Cavalleria Rusticana  is a 1959 Australian television play, an adaptation of the opera by Pietro Mascagni. It was directed by Alan Burke.

Music was provided by the Sydney Symphony Orchestra conducted by Georg Tintner.

Plot
In a Sicilian village, the peasant girl Santuzza falls for the tanner Turiddu. However he tires of her and returns to his old love, Lola. To get revenge, Santuzza tells Lola's husband Alfio about the love affair, resulting in a duel with knives between Alfio and Turiddu.

Cast 

 Heather McMillan as Santussa
 Alan Ferris as Turiddu
 Florence Taylor
 Neil Easton as Alfio
 Mary Tysoe as Lola

Production
It was the fourth live opera from the ABC following, "The Telephone," "Pagliacci", and "Prima Donna." Alan Burke had directed Prima Donna.

Singer Marie Tysoe later recalled "That was also performed live. We had monitors strategically placed in the sets so that the singers could always see the conductor."

Reception
The TV critic from the Sydney Morning Herald called it "no more than a partial success". He praised its "well planned and well designed sets" but thought it lacked movement and felt the singing "was often heavy and uncertain" and acting "either stagey or inhibited, and sometimes both.. It seems that the initial requirements for local televised opera is singers who can adapt their style to the searching eye of the camera.

See also
List of live television plays broadcast on Australian Broadcasting Corporation (1950s)

References

External links

Australian television plays
1959 television plays
Australian television plays based on operas
Films directed by Alan Burke (director)